Enchantment is a soul/R&B band formed in Detroit, Michigan by Emanuel "EJ" Johnson, Joe "Jobie" Thomas, Bobby Green, Edgar "Mickey" Clanton, and David Banks. They are best known for their mid-1970s hits, "Gloria", "Sunshine" and "It's You That I Need".

History

Beginnings
Enchantment was formed in the late 1960s at Detroit's Pershing High School, with the visually impaired Emanuel "EJ" Johnson as their lead singer. In 1971, Enchantment came to the attention of Dick Scott, a former Motown executive who headed his own artist development company, Artists International. In 1973, they formed an alliance with Michael Stokes, producer of Creative Source's hit, "Who Is He (And What Is He To You)".

Success
By 1976, Stokes had negotiated a recording deal through his association with Fred Frank, then head of Roadshow Records, who was also guiding the careers of B.T. Express and Brass Construction.  After their disco-oriented song "Come On And Ride", the band changed their focus to writing ballads. Their self titled debut album, Enchantment, contained two singles in that vein which charted well on the Billboard R&B chart – "Gloria" at number five and "Sunshine" at number three.

Their second album, Once Upon a Dream far surpassed its predecessor by charting at No. 8 on the R&B albums chart and at No. 46 on the Pop albums charts. It featured the crossover ballad "It's You That I Need", which topped the R&B charts. Overall, their attempts to diversify their sound by appealing to the disco audience failed, but their song, "If You're Ready (Here It Comes)" reached No. 14 on the R&B charts. In 1978, Roadshow ended its distribution agreement with United Artists and formed an alliance with RCA Records. In 1979, Enchantment released their third album, Journey to the Land Of... Enchantment, which was their final recording with Roadshow Records.

Decline
By 1980, Roadshow had folded as a label and Enchantment signed with RCA Records, where they recorded their fourth album, Soft Lights, Sweet Music, with top R&B producer, Don Davis. Both singles released charted at No. 47 in the 1981 charts. In 1982, they signed with Columbia Records and released two more albums; Enchanted Lady (1982) and Utopia (1984). By the end of the 1980s, the rise of funk and rap put a virtual end to ballad groups. All three albums barely dented the charts.

Recent work
In 2003, Enchantment released "God Bless America", in honor of troops fighting in Iraq. Proceeds from the single benefited the United Way. Jobie Thomas later left the group and has formed his own group known as Enchantment featuring Jobie Thomas.

Legacy
Although it was not a charting single itself, the Enchantment song "Forever More" (from Journey to the Land Of... Enchantment) was later sampled by singer-songwriter Anthony David for his song "4Evermore" (featuring Algebra and Phonte), which became a top-20 R&B hit in 2011.

Discography

Studio albums

Compilation albums
Golden Classics (1991, Collectables)
If You're Ready... The Best of Enchantment (1996, EMI)
Sunshine: The Enchantment Anthology (1975–1984) (2017, Big Break)

Singles

References

External links

Musical groups from Detroit
American soul musical groups
United Artists Records artists
RCA Records artists
Columbia Records artists
Musical quintets
1967 establishments in Michigan
Musical groups established in 1967
Pershing High School alumni